Eilema amaurus is a moth of the  subfamily Arctiinae. It is found on the Admiralty Islands.

References

amaurus